KTED (100.5 FM) is a radio station licensed to Evansville, Wyoming, United States, the station serves the Casper area. It broadcasts an active rock format. The station is owned by Robert D. Breck, Jr., through licensee Breck Media Group Wyoming, Inc. 
The station can also be heard on 104.5 FM KHAD in Upton, covering the northeastern corner of Wyoming. Note that as of August 24, 2021, KHAD was no longer simulcasting KTED, but was instead running an automated, commercial-free selection of classic hits with a station ID twice an hour.

References

External links
Official KTED website

TED
Active rock radio stations in the United States
Natrona County, Wyoming